The 2018 Louisville City FC season was the club's fourth season in Louisville, Kentucky playing in the United Soccer League, which as of 2018 is the second-tier league in the United States soccer league system.

The club began their pre-season campaign on February 24 before the league commenced on March 17. They also competed in the U.S. Open Cup entering in the second round.  They entered the season as the reigning USL Cup champions and became the first team in USL history to successfully defend their title.

Current squad 
final roster

Transfers

In

Out

Loans in

Competitions

Pre-season

USL

Eastern Conference standings

Results summary

Results

USL Playoffs

Results

U.S. Open Cup 

Louisville City entered the 2018 U.S. Open Cup with the rest of the United Soccer League in the second round.  Louisville reached the quarter finals of the competition for the first time in its history; the only non-MLS side to reach that round.  This included a 3–2 victory over the New England Revolution of MLS; Louisville's first victory over an MLS side.

Player statistics

Top scorers

Assist leaders

Clean sheets

Disciplinary

References

Louisville
Louisville City FC seasons
Louisville
Louisville City FC